Parveen Akhtar (born 1 January 1957) is a Pakistani politician who was a Member of the Provincial Assembly of the Punjab, from May 2013 to May 2018.

Early and personal life
She was born on 1 January 1957 in Okara, Pakistan.

She is wife of Mian Atta Muhammad Manika.

Political career

She was elected to the Provincial Assembly of the Punjab as a candidate of Pakistan Muslim League (N) on a reserved seat for women in 2013 Pakistani general election.

References

Living people
Punjab MPAs 2013–2018
1957 births
Pakistan Muslim League (N) politicians
Maneka family
Women members of the Provincial Assembly of the Punjab
21st-century Pakistani women politicians